Jodie Hutton (born 11 February 2001) is an English professional footballer who plays as a defender for Women's Championship club Bristol City. Hutton is a product of the Aston Villa Women's Academy.

In the 2018–19 Women's FA Cup, Hutton scored a hat-trick against Sheffield United, which enabled Aston Villa to reach the quarter-finals of the competition.

Career statistics

Club

Notes

References

2001 births
Living people
English women's footballers
England women's youth international footballers
Women's association football defenders
Aston Villa W.F.C. players
Women's Championship (England) players
Women's Super League players